Thorfinn  (Þorfinnr) is a Scandinavian name, which originally referred to the god Thor and which survived into Christian times.

Thorfinn may refer to:

 Thorfinn Torf-Einarsson (died c. 963), Earl of Orkney
 Thorfinn Karlsefni, Icelandic explorer
 Thorfinn the Mighty or Thorfinn Sigurdsson (1009?–c. 1065), Earl of Orkney
 Thorfinn of Hamar (died 1285), Christian bishop and saint
 Thorfinn (Vinland Saga), a fictional character from the manga series Vinland Saga

See also
 Torfinn, a related modern name
 Thorfinnsson
 Earl Thorfinn (disambiguation)

Scandinavian masculine given names

fr:Thorfinn (prénom)